Martina Hingis and Sania Mirza were the defending champions, but Mirza chose not to participate this year. Hingis played alongside Belinda Bencic, but lost in the first round to Gabriela Dabrowski and Michaëlla Krajicek.

Jeļena Ostapenko and Alicja Rosolska won the title, defeating Darija Jurak and Xenia Knoll in the final, 3–6, 6–2, [10–5].

Seeds

Draw

References 
 Draw

St. Petersburg Ladies' Trophy - Doubles
St. Petersburg Ladies' Trophy